"How to Disappear Completely" is a song by the English rock band Radiohead from their fourth studio album, Kid A (2000). It was produced by the band with their producer Nigel Godrich. It is titled after Doug Richmond's 1985 book How to Disappear Completely and Never Be Found. It was released as a promotional single in the US, Poland and Belgium.

Radiohead wrote "How to Disappear Completely" in mid-1997, during their tour of their third album, OK Computer (1997). They first performed it in 1998 during the tour. An early soundcheck performance features in the 1998 documentary Meeting People Is Easy.

During the Kid A sessions in 1999, Radiohead recorded demos for the song in various studios, before recording at their Oxfordshire studio at the end of January 2000. In early February, the strings were recorded and performed by the Orchestra of St John's inside a church near the band's studio, arranged by the multi-instrumentalist Jonny Greenwood on an ondes Martenot.

"How to Disappear Completely" is an acoustic ballad backed by orchestral strings and guitar effects. Radiohead-singer Yorke, the primary writer of the song, said it was his proudest work. It was included on the special edition of the greatest hits album Radiohead: The Best Of (2008). The song and its isolated strings track were included on the reissue-compilation Kid A Mnesia (2021).

Inspiration and writing

Considered one of the earliest songs from Kid A (2000), "How to Disappear Completely" was written primarily by the Radiohead singer, Thom Yorke, while credited to all of the band members, during the tour for their third album, OK Computer (1997). Yorke began writing it in June 1997, in Toronto, Canada. Later that month, Radiohead performed their then-biggest ever show at the RDS Arena in Dublin, Ireland. The performance was held in windy and rainy conditions. Yorke told Rolling Stone that he had been terrified, and that he had dreamed of running naked down Dublin's River Liffey, pursued by a tidal wave. The dream inspired "How to Disappear Completely"; Yorke said later: "There was nothing I could do. [...] The whole song is my experience of floating."

According to the guitarist Ed O'Brien, "How to Disappear Completely" was inspired by the RDS performance and the stress the band members, especially Yorke, experienced on tour. Yorke's experience performing with Radiohead at the 1997 Glastonbury Festival, a week after the RDS performance, was another inspiration. After technical problems, Yorke almost abandoned the show, but continued after urging from O'Brien. Yorke recalled: "I just needed a break. And in fact I didn't get one for another year and a bit, by which point I was pretty much catatonic."

In an interview with Terry David Mulligan in Canada in July 1997, Yorke said he had written a song the previous month that contains the chorus: "I'm not here / This isn't happening". The chorus stems from advice given to Yorke by his friend, the R.E.M. singer Michael Stipe, through a telephone conversation on how to deal with his stress from touring by repeating the phrase "I'm not here, this isn't happening" to himself. In turn, "How to Disappear Completely" inspired Stipe to write the song "Disappear" from R.E.M. album Reveal (2001); Stipe recounted in 2004 telephoning Yorke to apologize for stealing the concept behind the song, only to find Yorke responding that he had originally inspired him to write "How to Disappear Completely".

In late August 1997, Yorke performed an early acoustic version during a soundcheck in New York; footage from this performance features in the 1998 documentary Meeting People Is Easy. Radiohead performed further versions during the OK Computer tour in 1998. The versions are purported to be between seven to ten minutes in length; the final studio version would be last at six minutes, as Radiohead had shortened earlier songs such as "Just" and "Paranoid Android". Melody Maker likened the version in a 1998 review to Radiohead covering Unbelievable Truth, an acoustic band led by Yorke's younger brother, Andy.

Recording
After the OK Computer tour ended, Yorke suffered from writer's block and could not finish writing new songs on guitar. "How to Disappear Completely" was one of the few songs that was almost completely written prior to the Kid A and Amnesiac recording sessions. In early 1999, Radiohead recorded a version at Guillaume Tell Studios in Paris, but Yorke dismissed it, saying: "That sounds great, but it sounds like old Radiohead." On 27 July, during their sessions at the Batsford Park mansion in Gloucestershire, Radiohead recorded a new demo version. In September, O'Brien denied in his online diary a rumour that Radiohead was collaborating with the post-rock band Godspeed You! Black Emperor on the song.

In the same month, Radiohead moved to their new studio, in Sutton Courtenay, Oxfordshire. On 1 December, Radiohead recorded Philip Selway's drums in preparation for a collaboration with the Orchestra of St John's. The band chose the orchestra as they had performed pieces by the composers Krzysztof Penderecki and Olivier Messiaen. Yorke said he had no involvement with the song after recording this demo, and that the multi-instrumentalist Jonny Greenwood had completed it by himself.

The 1998 early version was more guitar-driven; instead, Radiohead rearranged the song by replacing their rock sound with an "extensive" string section. On 2 December, with assistance from the producer, Nigel Godrich, Greenwood, the only Radiohead member trained in music theory, began composing the string arrangement. He worked by multi-tracking his ondes Martenot, inspired by Messiaen, who popularised the instrument, and finished after two intermittent weeks the following month.

On 4 February 2000, Radiohead booked a three-hour session at Dorchester Abbey, a 12th-century church about five miles from their studio, where strings were recorded and performed by the Orchestra of St John's, and conducted by John Lubbock. The orchestration was influenced by Penderecki, who, like Messiaen, is an influence on Greenwood. According to Godrich, when Greenwood introducted his score to the orchestra members, "they all just sort of burst into giggles, because they couldn't do what he'd written, because it was impossible — or impossible for them, anyway." Nonetheless, Lubbock encouraged the orchestra to experiment and work with Greenwood's ideas.

According to Greenwood, the orchestra followed a technique for recording the strings that differed from most string sessions for rock songs in that they would not play consecutive half or long notes because they likened this to making "a row of balloons". The strings and Greenwood's ondes Martenot parts were recorded in one take using some microphones and an Apple G3 computer owned by Godrich. The concerts director, Alison Atkinson, said the session was "more experimental" than the orchestra's usual bookings. An isolated strings track, titled "How to Disappear into Strings", was included on the Kid A reissue Kid A Mnesia (2021).

Composition and lyrics
"How to Disappear Completely" is an acoustic-driven ballad backed by "forlorn" strings and "compelling" guitar effects, with elements of orchestral and ambient music. Several writers emphasized the song as a ballad; others classified it as post-rock. Ryan Pinkard of Tidal Magazine described it as a "majestic" pop ballad. Jazz Monroe of The Guardian categorised the song as avant-garde balladry, calling it a "masterpiece" that "orchestrates a stage-fright reverie with fragments of Robert Wyatt and Penderecki." Stephen Dalton of Uncut called it as a "sumptuous" orchestral ballad. Steve Lowe of Q called the song a "ghostly waltz-time" folk song with influences from the Smiths' album Meat Is Murder (1985).

"How to Disappear Completely" is the first track on Kid A that features Yorke's vocals clearly, with no processing effects, unlike the album's first three tracks: "Everything in Its Right Place", "Kid A" and "The National Anthem". The song is played in the key of F minor in a  time signature with a tempo of 102 beats per minute (BPM), while Yorke's vocals span a range of C4 to A5, which he performed in a "long-drawn-out" falsetto style. The chord progression follows a sequence of Cadd9–Em–Em6–G–Gsus4–D–Dadd4–EM6.

The song begins with a "discordant" string harmony, then a strummed D ninth chord acoustic guitar played by Yorke, backed by B string tunes, creating a "dissonant noise" that moves between the D major and F minor chords. O'Brien used guitar reverbs and delay effects, creating a melody that sinks between the A and E chords. The bassline enters at 0:23, playing chords of F–A–B–E–C, followed by two separate chords of E and F. The B♭ note ends at 1:37, the beginning of the chorus. The strings are attached to Yorke's vocals throughout the song. By the end of the song at 5:23, all instruments join together to produce a high-pitched note ranging from A to F. Greenwood's ondes Martenot parts appear low in the mix because of the string sounds. Jamie Kahn of Far Out praised the string section for blending with acoustic guitar and Yorke's "haunting" vocals to create an "eclectic, harmonious" mix.

The string section was inspired by Penderecki's Threnody to the Victims of Hiroshima (1961), which previously inspired the string section on the OK Computer track "Climbing Up the Walls". However, the author Peter Carney wrote: "It is true that guitarist Jonny Greenwood writes many atonal fragments after Penderecki's style, but structurally, 'How to Disappear Completely' mixes atonal exceptional fragments into tonal architecture." Carney explained that Greenwood derived the style from the jazz of Charles Mingus more than Penderecki.

Yorke initially introduced "How to Disappear Completely" "for the benefit of the bootleggers". He cited "Once in a Lifetime" (1980) by Talking Heads as a reference for writing the song. It had the working titles "This Is Not Happening" and "How to Disappear Completely and Never Be Found". The second title is taken from that of Doug Richmond's 1985 book, which explains how to erase personal identity and assume a new one, with a focus on taking a French leave. The lyrics are poetic and referential, with no literal interpretations, as in the lines: "Strobe lights and blown speakers / Fireworks and hurricanes / I'm not here / This isn't happening". James Oldham of NME wrote that the chorus, "I'm not here / This isn't happening", reflects Yorke's mental state of what and the rest of the band experienced from their tour for OK Computer.

Release and reception
"How to Disappear Completely" was released as the fourth track on Kid A, released on 27 September 2000. The music press predicted that the song would be released as a single due to its potential to be a hit, but Radiohead eventually did not release singles from the album. However, "How to Disappear Completely" was released in 2000 as a CD promotional single in Poland on Parlophone and in Belgium on EMI Belgium. In the US, it was released as a double A-side promotional single with "Idioteque" on Capitol Records. Along with "Idioteque", "How to Disappear Completely" was included on the compilation album 2001: A Sound Odyssey, released in the US in 2000 on Capitol. The song was included on the special edition of the greatest hits album Radiohead: The Best Of (2008) and the Kid A Mnesia reissue.

In a 2000 article published prior to the release of Kid A, Melody Maker's Andre Paine described "How to Disappear Completely" as "several minutes of music that sounds like the Smiths produced by DJ Shadow". Reviewing Kid A in 2000, NME's Keith Cameron wrote that the song sees Radiohead's "return to the big ballad template, as massed strings swoon and Yorke's voice soars transcendentally for the first time". The Rolling Stone critic, David Fricke, wrote that the song "moves like an ice floe: cold-blue folk rock with just a faint hint of heartbeat." Brent DiCrescenzo of Pitchfork stated that the song "boil[ed] down [OK Computer tracks] 'Let Down' and 'Karma Police' to their spectral essence", claiming it "comes closest to bridging Yorke's lyrical sentiment to the instrumental effect. [...] The strings melt and weep as the album shifts into its underwater mode." Thomas Leatham of Far Out (magazine) described it as one of the saddest songs ever written and praised the gorgeous string section which would later surface in the Radiohead's A Moon Shaped Pool album.  

Billboard called "How to Disappear Completely" "haunting", noting that "vocalist Thom Yorke is as tortured as ever, proclaiming 'I'm not here/This isn't happening' [...] as if he'd already vanished long ago." Cam Lindsay of Exclaim! described the song as "a moody acoustic number" and "the most radio compatible track" on Kid A, comparing it to the OK Computer track "Exit Music (For a Film)".  The Uncut journalist, Simon Reynolds, described the song as a "missing link" between Scott Walker's orchestral music and the "swoonily amorphous" ballads on My Bloody Valentine's album Isn't Anything (1988). He also likened it to a Walker ballad composed by Penderecki, in an article for another magazine, The Wire. The Morning Call likened the song's "haunting and calming" sound to the sound of the ocean. The author Greg Kot wrote it sounds like a lost soundtrack to Alfred Hitchcock's 1958 film Vertigo. The author Steven Hyden believes that the song could have been on OK Computer if Walker had produced it. He also compared the acoustic guitar, which "slowly builds to an operatic emotional climax", to previous Radiohead songs such as "Fake Plastic Trees" and "Exit Music".

Legacy
Yorke cited "How to Disappear Completely" as his favorite song from the Kid A and Amnesiac period, saying: "We didn't care how it could be seen as pretentious or anything. It just sounds glorious. What Jonny did to it is amazing." During a 2006 interview on BBC Two's The Culture Show, Yorke named the song as the one he wanted to be remembered for, calling it "the most beautiful thing we ever did". Rolling Stone readers voted the track as one of the ten best Radiohead songs.

Credits and personnel

Radiohead
 Thom Yorke
 Jonny Greenwood
 Ed O'Brien
 Colin Greenwood
 Philip Selway

Technical
 Nigel Godrich production, engineering, mixing
 Radiohead production
 Gerard Navarro production assistance, additional engineering
 Graeme Stewart additional engineering

Cover
 Stanley Donwood
 Thom Yorke 

Additional musicians
 Orchestra of St John's strings
 John Lubbock conducting
 Sue Lynn violin
 Marjorie Hodge violin
 Jeremy Metcalfe violin
 Jan Schmolk violin
 Jill Samuel violin
 Ann Morfee violin
 Jonathan Strange violin
 Nicolette Brown violin
 Eleanor Mathieson violin
 Hilary-Jane Parker violin
 Kirsten Klingels violin
 Caroline Balding violin
 Jane Atkins viola
 Richard Nelson viola
 Esther Geldard viola
 Chris Pitsillides viola
 John Heley cello
 Jo Cole cello
 David Bucknall cello
 Jonathan Tunnell cello
 Tony Hougham bass
 Sarah Haynes bass

Notes and references

Footnotes

Citations

Sources

 
 
 
 
 
 
 
 
 
 
 

Radiohead songs
2000 songs
Songs written by Thom Yorke
Songs written by Jonny Greenwood
Songs written by Ed O'Brien
Songs written by Colin Greenwood
Songs written by Philip Selway
Song recordings produced by Nigel Godrich
2000s ballads
Folk ballads
Pop ballads
British folk rock songs
Post-rock songs
Songs about mental health
Songs about depression
Songs about death
Songs about dreams
Songs about rivers